Elli et Jacno was a French 1980s electropop group. They were quite successful in France and to some extent in Britain, having been featured once on the front page of Melody Maker magazine.

History
Denis Quilliard (alias Jacno) and Elli Medeiros decided to start a music duo after leaving the punk band The Stinky Toys. Jacno composed and performed the music and Elli wrote and sang the lyrics. They released three albums together before splitting up and beginning solo careers. A compilation Symphonies de Poche was released by Virgin ten years later.

Discography
 Tout va sauter (1980, Vogue)
 Inédits 77-81 (1981, compilation, Vogue)
 Boomerang (1982, Celluloid)
 Les Nuits de la Pleine Lune (1984, CBS)
 Symphonies de Poche (1994, compilation, Virgin)

References

French musical groups